Yieldstreet is an American company based in New York City. The company focuses on expanding access to private market investment products. Yieldstreet provides investments in art, real estate, legal, and various other industries.

History
Yieldstreet was founded by Milind Mehere and Michael Weisz. Mehere was previously a co-founder of Yodle and has led the company since it was started.

Yieldstreet acquired Athena Art Finance from The Carlyle Group for $170 million in April 2019. Yieldstreet then acquired WealthFlex to integrate a self-directed IRA functionality for their investors later in 2019.

The Yieldstreet Prism Fund was introduced in March 2020 as a multi-asset closed-end fund with quarterly distributions, that contains a blended portfolio of asset classes and cash, allowing investors to access multiple alternative asset classes with a single investment. Yieldstreet's individual offerings are typically only available to accredited investors, but the Yieldstreet Prism Fund does not involve any income or net worth minimums.

In November 2021, Yieldstreet launched the Art Equity Platform, which holds a portfolio of artwork from after World War II, as well as contemporary and modern contemporary art. People are able to invest in the art and earn returns of 15 to 17 percent.

In April 2022, Yieldstreet announced that it would allow its users to invest in startups, and that the first companies included were Flutterwave and Fetch Rewards. The arrangement is made in partnership with Greycroft.

In May 2022, Yieldstreet announced the launch of the company’s new consumer tool, Yieldstreet’s crypto wallet. This tool allows investors to deposit Bitcoin and Ethereum into a custodian-managed secured account with the option to convert the cryptocurrency into fiat currency to invest in Yieldstreet’s offerings.

In August 2022, Yieldstreet announced the closing of a $400 million credit facility from Monroe Capital, which is dedicated to pursuing new and compelling investment opportunities that further widen the scope and number of available offerings on Yieldstreet’s platform.

Track Record
As of 7/18/22, Yieldstreet has achieved 260 matured offerings for their investors, with $1.7 billion in matured principal at a realized net annual return of 9.8%. 

In 2023, Yieldstreet crossed $2 billion in principal and interest returned to their investors since inception.

Marine Default
Yieldstreet attracted attention in 2020 for an $89 million default in their marine portfolio, with Yieldstreet alleging in federal district court in Manhattan that the borrower, the Lakhani family, "literally lost track of many vessels, some larger than three football fields."

Shortly thereafter, Yieldstreet obtained an injunction from the UK High Court that froze $76.7 million in Lakhani family assets. The recovery remains ongoing.

References

External Links
 yieldstreet.com 

Companies based in Manhattan
Investment companies based in New York City